John G. Nix (born November 24, 1976) is a former American football defensive lineman in the National Football League for the Dallas Cowboys, Cleveland Browns and Arizona Cardinals. He also was a member of the Amsterdam Admirals in NFL Europe, the Montreal Alouettes of the Canadian Football League (CFL), and played in the Arena Football League. He played college football at the University of Southern Mississippi.

Early years
Nix attended George County High School, where as a senior he made 75 tackles, while receiving second-team All-state and district's most valuable defensive lineman honors. He was also invited to play in the Mississippi/Alabama High School All-Star Game.

He also practiced track, finishing third in the state's shot put competition.

College career
Nix accepted a football scholarship from the University of Southern Mississippi. He became a starter at defensive tackle as a redshirt freshman, posted 45 tackles, while helping his team to a 9-3 record and a 41-7 win over the University of Pittsburgh in the 1997 Liberty Bowl.

The next year, he started 9 out of 11 games, collecting 47 tackles. As a junior, he was limited throughout the season with a toe injury, making 21 tackles and 2 sacks, while helping his team win the Conference USA championship with a 9-3 record and a 23-17 win over Colorado State University in the 1999 Liberty Bowl.

As a senior, he registered 33 tackles (7 for loss), 4 sacks, helping the team rank second in the nation in total defense and to win 28-21 over Texas Christian University in the 2000 Mobile Alabama Bowl. He finished his college career with 146 tackles (65 solo), 9 sacks and 22 tackles for loss.

Professional career

Dallas Cowboys
Nix was selected by the Dallas Cowboys in the seventh round (240th overall) of the 2001 NFL Draft. As a rookie, he was the backup of defensive tackle Brandon Noble and recorded 22 tackles and 2 forced fumbles. He is better known for causing a key fumble that helped the team win 9-7 against the Washington Redskins in week 5.

The next year, he played 14 games, finishing with 21 tackles, 9 quarterback pressures and one forced fumble. In 2003, with the arrival of new head coach Bill Parcells, he was waived on August 25.

San Francisco 49ers
On August 26, 2003, he was claimed off waivers by the San Francisco 49ers and released five days later.

Cleveland Browns
Nix was signed as a free agent by the Cleveland Browns on December 23, 2003. He was allocated to the Amsterdam Admirals of the NFL Europe in 2004, where he started 10 games at defensive tackle, while recording 21 tackles and two sacks. He was cut from the Browns on September 5, 2004.

Arizona Cardinals
On September 8, 2004, he signed as a free agent with the Arizona Cardinals. He was cut on October 6, after being inactive in 3 games.

Montreal Alouettes
In 2005, he joined the Montreal Alouettes of the Canadian Football League. He began the season as a starter on defense until he injured his shoulder during the eighth game. He played one more season for Montreal, before leaving to join the Arena Football League back in the United States.

Arena Football League (2007–2010)
In 2007, Nix signed with the Las Vegas Gladiators and registered 2 tackles and one sack in two games. He was traded to the New York Dragons on March 13, earning Arena Football League (AFL) All-Rookie honors after playing in 15 games, while making 10.5 tackles, 2 tackles-for-loss, 2 sacks (tied for the team lead) and two quarterback pressures. In eight games in 2008, he recorded 8 tackles and one fumble recovery.

Personal life
His favorite place to go while on vacation is Amsterdam, and his favorite restaurant is the Waffle House.

See also
 List of Arena Football League and National Football League players

References

Living people
1976 births
People from Lucedale, Mississippi
Players of American football from Mississippi
American football defensive linemen
Southern Miss Golden Eagles football players
Dallas Cowboys players
Cleveland Browns players
Arizona Cardinals players
Amsterdam Admirals players
Montreal Alouettes players
Las Vegas Gladiators players
New York Dragons players
Dallas Vigilantes players